All Things Fall Apart is a 2011 American direct-to-video drama film directed by Mario Van Peebles and starring Ray Liotta, 50 Cent, Mario Van Peebles, and Lynn Whitfield. It was filmed in Michigan and premiered at the Miami International Film Festival.

Plot 
Deon (50 Cent), a skilled college Running back falls ill from a genetic disease just when he was about to go into the championships of the NFL. Though idolized for his athletic ability, Deon shares the glory on and off of the football field. His mother Bee (Lynn Whitfield) is incredibly proud and his younger brother Sean (Cedric Sanders)—understandably jealous. Eric (Mario Van Peebles, Deon's stepfather), sees the football star as a winning lottery ticket. Deon’s doctor, Dr. Brintall (Ray Liotta) informs him that he can’t play football again, but there is always hope. While fighting cancer, Deon seeks to finish what he started. In the end, while at a catering party, he runs towards the football field just like the good old times and raising his arms pretending that he hit the touchdown while the screen fades black as the credits roll.

Cast 

Curtis "50 Cent" Jackson as Deon
Ray Liotta as Dr. Brintall
Mario Van Peebles as  Eric
Lynn Whitfield as Bee
Ambyr Childers as Sherry
Elizabeth Rodriguez as Mrs. Lopez
Cedric Sanders as Sean
Tracey Heggins as Sharon
Steve Eastin as Coach Harper
Chanel Farrell as Carey

Controversy over film title 
The movie was produced under the same title as Chinua Achebe's 1958 novel Things Fall Apart. After being contacted by Achebe's legal team, 50 Cent offered $1 million to keep the title Things Fall Apart for the film. The author of the 1958 novel took this as an insult. The foundation that manages Achebe's copyrights said: "The novel with the said title was initially produced in 1958. It is listed as the most-read book in modern African literature, and won't be sold for even £1 billion." The film was renamed to All Things Fall Apart.

Production 
50 Cent, who based his character on a childhood friend who died of cancer, lost up to 54 pounds in order to accurately portray his emaciated character, dropping from "214 pounds to 160 in nine weeks after liquid dieting and running on a treadmill three hours a day" according to the Associated Press.

See also 
List of black films of the 2010s

References

External links 
 
 

2011 films
American football films
Films directed by Mario Van Peebles
Films shot in Michigan
African-American drama films
2011 drama films
2010s English-language films
2010s American films